Deep Kiss may refer to:

 French kiss, an expression of affection
 Deep Kiss (manhwa), a Korean manhwa by Hwang Mi Ri
 "Deep Kiss", a song by Mitsou